Brigadier General James Bruce Jardine  (1870 – 17 March 1955) was a British soldier and diplomat.  He earned the rank of Brigadier-General in the service of the 5th Lancers.

Family life
Jardine was born in Edinburgh, Scotland in 1870 and was educated at Charterhouse School and then the Royal Military College at Sandhurst. Jardine was the grandson of the explorer James Bruce who traced the source of the Nile River; and he was named for that maternal ancestor.   In December 1908, he married Agnes Sara Hargreaves Brown.  His wife was the daughter of Sir Alexander Brown, 1st Baronet.

Career
Jardine joined the 5th Lancers in 1890 and saw active service in the Second Boer War, including the defence of Ladysmith and the sortie of 7 December 1899. He was appointed a Companion of the Distinguished Service Order in November 1900, for his actions in South Africa.

In 1904, Captain Jardine was sent to Tokyo to learn the Japanese language.  He and his superiors were anticipating what would become the Russo-Japanese War. He was posted to the British legation as one of several military attachés, including Captain Alexander Bannerman, Captain Berkeley Vincent and Captain Arthur Hart-Synnot.

When the First World War began, Jardine held the rank of Major. He commanded 97th Brigade of 32nd Division during the Battle of the Somme in 1916.

In later life, Jardine was named Deputy Lieutenant (DL) of Roxburghshire, Scotland, and from 1952 an ensign in the Royal Company of Archers.

Honours and awards
 CMG : Companion of the Order of St. Michael and St. George - 1917.
 DSO : Companion of the Distinguished Service Order - 29 November 1900 - for services during the Second Boer War in South Africa.
 Japanese Order of the Sacred Treasure - 1905.

See also
 Military attachés and observers in the Russo-Japanese War

Notes

References
 Burke, John and Bernard Burke. (1914).  Burke's genealogical and heraldic history of peerage, baronetage and knightage. London: Burke's Peerage Ltd. OCLC 2790692
 Debrett, John, Charles Kidd, David Williamson. (1990).  Debrett's Peerage and Baronetage.  New York: Macmillan. 

1870 births
1955 deaths
British Army brigadiers
Companions of the Distinguished Service Order
Graduates of the Royal Military College, Sandhurst
People of the Russo-Japanese War
Recipients of the Order of the Sacred Treasure
Companions of the Order of St Michael and St George
Deputy Lieutenants of Roxburghshire
People educated at Charterhouse School
Military personnel from Edinburgh
5th Royal Irish Lancers officers
British Army personnel of the Second Boer War
British Army cavalry generals of World War I
Members of the Royal Company of Archers